Parasa indetermina, the stinging rose moth, is a moth of the family Limacodidae. It is found in the United States from New York to Florida, west to Missouri, Texas, and Oklahoma.

The wingspan is 23–30 mm. Adults are on wing from June to July.

The larvae feed on apple, dogwood, hickory, maple, oak, poplar, and rose bushes. and possess numerous urticating hairs, from which they derive their common name.

References

Limacodidae
Moths described in 1832
Taxa named by Jean Baptiste Boisduval
Moths of North America